Hubertus Jan van der Vaart (born 13 May 1955) is a Dutch American businessman, Rhodes Scholar, and co-founder/Chairman of SEAF (Small Enterprise Assistance Funds).

Biography
He was born in Leiden, Netherlands on 13 May 1955 to Hubertus Robert van der Vaart (2 March 1922 – 16 November 2002).

He moved to the United States as a child and grew up in Raleigh, North Carolina where his father was a professor at N.C. State University. He attended Needham B. Broughton High School. Van der Vaart speaks his native Dutch, English, German, French, and some Polish and Russian as well. Van der Vaart resides in Northern Virginia.

Van der Vaart later attended the University of North Carolina, Chapel Hill where he received his BA in Politics and Economics and was a brother of Chi Psi fraternity. Van der Vaart was awarded a Rhodes Scholarship and received an M. Phil. in Economics from Oxford University while rowing on the Boat Club (OUBC). Van der Vaart then attended Yale Law School where he received his JD and studied finance at the Yale School of Management. He proceeded to practice law as a partner and associate with Gibson, Dunn & Crutcher LLP in Washington, Brussels, Paris, New York City, and Frankfurt before co-founding SEAF along with Tom Gibson in 1989. While serving as CEO, Van der Vaart oversaw over $450 million invested throughout emerging market small and medium enterprises (SMEs) in dozens of countries worldwide.

Publications
Defining SMEs: A Less Imperfect Way of Defining Small and Medium Enterprises in Developing Countries September 2008, Brookings Global Economy and Development

References

External links
 Seaf.com
 Investing.businessweek.com
 Milkeninstitue.org
 Clintonfoundation.org
 Thebusinessstartupcompany.com
 Tbliconference.com
 Socialcapitlamarkets.net
 Opic.gov
 Pe.som.yale.edu
 Globalturkcapital.com

1955 births
American business executives
People from Leiden
Businesspeople from Raleigh, North Carolina
Dutch emigrants to the United States
Dutch business executives
University of North Carolina at Chapel Hill alumni
American Rhodes Scholars
Alumni of Magdalen College, Oxford
Yale Law School alumni
Yale School of Management alumni
American lawyers
Living people
Needham B. Broughton High School alumni
People associated with Gibson Dunn